This is a list of United Nations Security Council Resolutions that have been vetoed by one of the five permanent members of the security council between 16 February 1946 and the present day.

Table

See also
United Nations
United Nations Security Council
United Nations Security Council veto power
Vetoed United Nations Security Council resolutions on Syria

References

Further reading
 Melling, Graham, and Anne Dennett. "The Security Council veto and Syria: responding to mass atrocities through the 'Uniting for Peace' resolution." Indian Journal of International Law 57.3 (2017): 285-307. online

 Sellen, Keith L. "The United Nations Security Council veto in the new world order." Military Law Review 138 (1992): 187+ online.

Veto
List